Loke is a former settlement in the Municipality of Trbovlje in central Slovenia. It is now part of the town of Trbovlje. The area is part of the traditional region of Styria. It is now included with the rest of the municipality in the Central Sava Statistical Region.

Geography
Loke lies in the northern part of Trbovlje, below the southeast slope of Klek Hill.

History
Loke had a population of 4,781 in 1900. Loke was annexed by Trbovlje in 1953, ending its existence as an independent settlement.

References

External links
Loke at Geopedia

Populated places in the Municipality of Trbovlje
Former settlements in Slovenia